The Province of Potenza is a province in the Basilicata region of southern Italy. Its capital is the city of Potenza.

Geography
There are 100 comuni (singular: comune) in the province (see Comuni of the Province of Potenza).

The province is characterized by various natural landscapes, ranging from the mountain lakes of Monticchio, the Lucan forest, the Monte Sirino massif, the large National Park of Pollino (shared by Calabria) and the Tyrrhenian coast of Maratea. The largest city is Potenza, followed by Melfi.

History
In 272 BC the province was conquered by the Romans. The new rulers named the region Lucania. In the 11th century, the area became part of the Duchy of Apulia, which was at the time ruled by the Normans. From the 13th century, it was part of the Kingdom of Naples, though Potenza was ruled by local vassals.  In 1861, the province was unified with the rest of Italy in the newly formed Kingdom of Italy.

The region has suffered from numerous earthquakes in historic times, and is still a seismically active area.

References

External links

 Official website 

 
Potenza